John Pierson may refer to:

John Pierson (baseball) (born 1953), American baseball player and coach
John Pierson (filmmaker) (born 1954), American independent filmmaker
John Pierson (journalist) (1937–2018), American writer for The Wall Street Journal
John Pierson (musician), American guitarist
Jack Pierson (born 1960), American photographer and artist
John Frederick Pierson (1839–1932), Civil War brevet Brigadier General and society leader

See also
Johnny Peirson (1925–2021), Canadian ice hockey player
John Pearson (disambiguation)